Lecithocera goniometra is a moth in the family Lecithoceridae. It was described by Edward Meyrick in 1929. It is found on Luzon in the Philippines.

The wingspan is about 15 mm. The forewings are whitish ochreous with a short dark fuscous streak on the base of the costa. The discal stigmata are black, the second larger, an additional black dot beneath this on the lower angle of the cell. There are also three or four moderate grey dots on the termen. The hindwings are grey.

References

Moths described in 1929
goniometra